Gabriel Millet (17 April 1867 – 8 May 1953) was a French archaeologist and historian.

Biography 
After he passed his agrégation of history in 1891, Gabriel Millet became a member of the French School at Athens, then director of the École pratique des hautes études in religious sciences in 1899, and professor at the Collège de France in 1927.

A voyager, he travelled throughout Europe, Greece, Macedonia, the Balkans. In 1906  Gabriel Millet, Vladimir Petković and Josef Strzygowski began research on Serbian painting, which they "acclaimed it to be among the finest creations of medieval Europe".After the trip he wrote books, including his university thesis, on the finding of his research in Serbia.

Millet was the author of numerous books on Byzantine art. In 1930, in collaboration with Louis Bréhier, he led an archaeological mission to Mount Athos. He founded the series "Archives d'Athos" at the College de France, under the patronage of the Academie des Inscriptions et Belles-Lettres and the Academy of Athens. 
Later, Gabriel Millet led two more Serbian archaeological missions of 1934 and 1935, sponsored by the French Government in collaboration with the Kingdom of Yugoslavia. All practical difficulties such as transportation, supplies, scaffolding, were ironed out in that journey thanks to the energy and kindness of his long-time friends, professor of art Đurađ Bošković, his wife and colleagues, including Vladimir Petković and Milan Kašanin.

See also
 Milan Kašanin
 Vladimir Petković
 Đurađ Bošković
 Stevan Dimitrijević
 Nikodim Kondakov
 Ljuba Kovačević
 Ljubomir Stojanović
 Vladimir Ćorović
 Alexander Solovyev

References

External links 
 Gabriel Millet (1867-1953)  on Index of Christian Art
 Millet, Gabriel in the Dictionary of Art Historians
 Éloge funèbre de M. Gabriel Millet, membre ordinaire
 Obituary 
 Notice sur la vie et les travaux de M. Gabriel Millet, membre de l'Académie

French archaeologists
Travelers
1867 births
People from Saint-Louis, Senegal
1952 deaths
French Byzantinists
Academic staff of the Collège de France
Members of the French School at Athens
Academic staff of the École pratique des hautes études